The 114th United States Congress began on January 3, 2015. There were 13 new senators (one Democrat, 12 Republicans) and 59 new representatives (15 Democrats, 44 Republicans), as well as two new delegates (one Democrat, one Republican), at the start of its first session. Additionally, seven representatives (two Democrats, five Republicans) took office on various dates in order to fill vacancies during the 114th Congress before it ended on January 3, 2017.

The president of the House Democratic freshman class was Ted Lieu of California, while the president of the House Republican freshman class was Ken Buck of Colorado. Additionally, the Republican's freshmen liaison was Mimi Walters of California.

Senate

House of Representatives

Took office January 3, 2015

Non-voting delegates

Took office during the 114th Congress

See also 
 List of United States senators in the 114th Congress
 List of members of the United States House of Representatives in the 114th Congress by seniority

Notes

References

Freshman class members
114